Osama Vinladen Jiménez López (born 7 October 2002) is a Peruvian professional footballer who plays as a midfielder for Peruvian Segunda División side Unión Comercio.

Club career
Born in Rioja, Vinladen made his professional debut for Unión Comercio in the Peruvian Primera División on 30 May 2018 against Universidad San Martín. He came on as a 87th-minute substitute as Unión Comercio drew the match 0–0.

International career
Vinladen was part of the Peru U-15 squad which participated in the 2017 South American U-15 Championship.

Personal life
Vinladen is named after Osama bin Laden, the founder of the terrorist group Al-Qaeda; the difference in spelling is due to the similarity of b and v in Spanish. Vinladen has a brother named Sadam Huseín, the Spanish spelling of Iraqi leader Saddam Hussein, and his sister would have been called George Bush if she were a boy.

Vinladen said of his unusual name: "There is a person called Hitler also in Peru. Jesus saved the world and there are Jesuses who do harm. Because there is an Osama who killed people, I don’t think there has to be a law about the name. It draws a lot of attention, from what I see."

Career statistics

Club

References

External links
 

2002 births
Living people
People from San Martín Region
Peruvian footballers
Association football midfielders
Unión Comercio footballers
Peruvian Primera División players